Nalimov may refer to one of the following persons

Eugene Nalimov, a Russian chess programmer.
Vasily Nalimov, a Russian philosopher and humanist.